Heath "Heathcliff" Slocumb (born June 7, 1966) is a former Major League Baseball (MLB) relief pitcher. He batted and threw right-handed.

Early life and amateur career
As a child, Slocumb was nicknamed "Heathcliff" after the comic strip cat of the same name.

Slocumb did not play Little League or even sandlot baseball as a child. According to his high school coach, he first played baseball when he showed up to tryouts as a junior at John Bowne High School in Flushing, Queens without a glove. According to a scout, his high school coach told him Slocumb was a football player who had tried out for every team at the school. Despite a strong arm, Slocumb had poor pitching mechanics and was not selected in the 1984 MLB draft. Slocumb caught the attention of a New York Mets scout who put him on an amateur team until July 17, 1984 when the Mets signed him for $5,000.

Professional career
In a 10-year career, Slocumb played with the Chicago Cubs, Cleveland Indians, Philadelphia Phillies, Boston Red Sox, Seattle Mariners, Baltimore Orioles, St. Louis Cardinals, and San Diego Padres.

He collected 98 saves, including 32 for the Phillies in 1995 and 31 with Boston in 1996.

Slocumb was traded in mid-1997 from Boston to Seattle for pitcher Derek Lowe and catcher Jason Varitek, in what is often cited in retrospect as one of the most one-sided trades in baseball history. At the time, Lowe had pitched in only 12 major-league games with an ERA of nearly 7, and Varitek had never played in the majors.  However, Lowe and Varitek both went on to make multiple All-Star teams and were major contributors to the 2004 World Series Champion Red Sox. In 2005, Varitek was named captain of the Red Sox. Although Slocumb helped the Mariners make the playoffs in 1997, his career had dissipated significantly by 1998 and he was never effective again.

Personal life
Slocumb married and had two daughters with his high school sweetheart, Deborah, before she died of breast cancer in 1992. The daughters lived with their maternal grandmother in Richmond Hill, Queens during his playing career.

References

External links

1966 births
Living people
National League All-Stars
Major League Baseball pitchers
Baltimore Orioles players
Boston Red Sox players
Chicago Cubs players
Cleveland Indians players
Philadelphia Phillies players
Seattle Mariners players
St. Louis Cardinals players
San Diego Padres players
Sportspeople from Queens, New York
Baseball players from New York City
African-American baseball players
Kingsport Mets players
Little Falls Mets players
Peoria Chiefs players
Winston-Salem Spirits players
Charlotte Knights players
Iowa Cubs players
Memphis Redbirds players
21st-century African-American people
20th-century African-American sportspeople